Basanti or Bashanti may refer to:

Entertainment
 Basanti (2000 film), a Nepali romantic film 
 Basanti (2008 film), a Punjabi film
 Basanti, a character from Sholay

People
 Basanti Kumal Chaudhari, Nepalese athlete
 Basanti Devi (1880–1974), Indian independence activist 
 Basanti Dulal Nagchaudhuri (1917–2006), Indian physicist and academic
 Basanti Sarma (born 1944), Indian politician
 Graham Basanti, Indian female priest

Places
 Basanti, South 24 Parganas, a town in West Bengal, India
 Basanti (community development block)
 Basanti (Vidhan Sabha constituency)